The enzyme isohexenylglutaconyl-CoA hydratase catalyzes the chemical reaction

3-hydroxy-3-(4-methylpent-3-en-1-yl)glutaryl-CoA  3-(4-methylpent-3-en-1-yl)pent-2-enedioyl-CoA + H2O

This enzyme belongs to the family of lyases, specifically the hydro-lyases, which cleave carbon-oxygen bonds.  The systematic name of this enzyme class is 3-hydroxy-3-(4-methylpent-3-en-1-yl)glutaryl-CoA hydro-lyase [3-(4-methylpent-3-en-1-yl)pent-2-enedioyl-CoA-forming]. Other names in common use include 3-hydroxy-3-isohexenylglutaryl-CoA-hydrolase, isohexenylglutaconyl coenzyme A hydratase, β-isohexenylglutaconyl-CoA-hydratase, and 3-hydroxy-3-(4-methylpent-3-en-1-yl)glutaryl-CoA hydro-lyase.

References

 

EC 4.2.1
Enzymes of unknown structure